Lyallpur Football Club is a Pakistani professional football club based in Faisalabad, Punjab, Pakistan. The club was founded as University Football Club and changed their name to current before the start of 2014–15 Pakistan Football Federation League.

Football clubs in Pakistan
Football in Faisalabad
Association football clubs established in 2014
2014 establishments in Pakistan